The Lamplighter is a 1921 American silent drama film directed by Howard M. Mitchell and starring Shirley Mason, Raymond McKee and Philo McCullough.

Cast
 Shirley Mason as Gertie
 Raymond McKee as Willie Sullivan
 Ethelbert Knott as The Lamplighter 
 Edwin B. Tilton as Malcolm Graham 
 Iris Ashton as Emily Graham
 Philo McCullough as Philip Amory
 Madge Hunt as The Housekeeper

References

Bibliography
 Robert B. Connelly. The Silents: Silent Feature Films, 1910-36, Volume 40, Issue 2. December Press, 1998.

External links
 

1921 films
1921 drama films
1920s English-language films
American silent feature films
Silent American drama films
American black-and-white films
Films directed by Howard M. Mitchell
Fox Film films
1920s American films